The Northern League  is a semi-professional New Zealand association football competition. It is a top-tier competition during the winter season, and sits at step two overall.

The Northern League includes football clubs located in the northern part of the North Island from the Northland, Auckland, Waikato and Bay of Plenty regions. The competition was known as the NRFL Premier until 2021, when New Zealand's football league system was restructured. Clubs compete each season to qualify for the New Zealand National League.

History

The first four years (1965–1969)
In the years 1965–1969, before the launch of a National Soccer League, the Northern League was the highest level competition available to the clubs in the northern region. When the National Soccer League was created in 1970, the Northern League became one of its feeder leagues.

In 1997 and 1998, when the National Soccer League operated as an invitation-only summer league, the Northern League again became the highest level club competition available to the clubs from the northern provinces.

Present day
With the demise of the club-based National Soccer League in 2004, the Northern League, now known as Lotto Sport Italia NRFL Men's Premier, became part of the highest level of football league competition in New Zealand for the third time in its history. The league runs between the New Zealand autumn and winter months (April to September), while the New Zealand Football Championship runs between the New Zealand spring and summer months (October to March).

Renaming and restructuring of leagues in the country
In March 2021, New Zealand Football announced a change to the structure of both the premiership and the top regional leagues around the country. The four top regional leagues (NRFL Premier, Central Premier League, Mainland Premier League and the FootballSouth Premier League) would be formed into the Northern League, Central League, and the Southern League. These leagues would allow local clubs to qualify for the premiership season (now known as the National League Championship), with the top 4 teams from the Northern League, the top 3 teams from the Central League, and the top 2 teams from the Southern League making up the competition, alongside the Wellington Phoenix Reserve side. All teams that qualify plus the Phoenix Reserves, would then play a single round-robin competition between September and December.

Current Northern League structure
  Northern League (this page)
 NRFL Championship
 NRFL Northern Conference / NRFL Southern Conference
NRF League One/ WaiBOP League One
Community Leagues

Sponsors
The following list is of the official sponsors of the League, unless otherwise noted.

Current
 Kia Motors 2010–2012, (marketing partner)
 Lotto Sport Italia 2008–2012, (primary sponsor)
 ASB Bank 2010–2012, (marketing partner)
 Prime (New Zealand) 2010–2012, (TV channel), (TV partner)
 FTN – Family Television Network 2010–2012, (TV channel), (TV partner)
 TVNZ 2010–2012,(TV channel), (official TV sponsor)
 Sky Network Television 2009–present, (TV channel), (TV partner – For national & international broadcasting)

Current clubs

As of the 2023 season.

Past champions

 1965 – Eastern Suburbs AFC
 1966 – Eastern Suburbs AFC
 1967 – Ponsonby AFC
 1968 – Mount Wellington
 1969 – Mount Wellington
 1970 – Mt Albert
 1971 – Takapuna City
 1972 – Hamilton Wanderers
 1973 – North Shore United
 1974 – Eden
 1975 – Manurewa
 1976 – Hamilton Wanderers
 1977 – Courier Rangers
 1978 – Manurewa
 1979 – Hamilton Wanderers
 1980 – Takapuna City
 1981 – East Coast Bays
 1982 – Papatoetoe
 1983 – University of Auckland
 1984 – Hamilton Wanderers
 1985 – Takapuna City
 1986 – Mount Maunganui
 1987 – AFC Waikato
 1988 – Takapuna City
 1989 – Mount Roskill
 1990 – Mt Albert-Ponsonby
 1991 – Papatoetoe
 1992 – Oratia United
 1993 – Ellerslie
 1994 – Mount Maunganui
 1995 – Melville United
 1996 – Lynn-Avon United
 1997 – Mount Wellington
 1998 – Metro F.C.
 1999 – Tauranga City
 2000 – Tauranga City
 2001 – North Shore United
 2002 – Glenfield Rovers
 2003 – Glenfield Rovers
 2004 – Central United
 2005 – Bay Olympic
 2006 – Bay Olympic
 2007 – Central United
 2008 – Central United
 2009 – Melville United
 2010 – East Coast Bays
 2011 – Bay Olympic
 2012 – Bay Olympic
 2013 – East Coast Bays
 2014 – Glenfield Rovers
 2015 – Eastern Suburbs AFC
 2016 – Central United
 2017 – Onehunga Sports
 2018 – Onehunga Sports
 2019 – North Shore United
 2020 – season cancelled due to COVID-19
 2021 – Auckland City
 2022 – Auckland City

Performance by club

Notable players
This list consists of past or present notable players that have either represented an international team, or made more than fifty appearances at a professional level in their careers.

  Chris Wood
  Danny Hay
  Cameron Howieson
  Te Atawhai Hudson-Wihongi
  Tim Payne
  Marco Rojas
  Ryan Thomas
  Ivan Vicelich
  Gareth Rowe
  Ross Nicholson
  Kayne Vincent
  Cole Tinkler
  Kris Bright
  Alex Greive
  Monty Patterson
  David Browne
  Tommy Semmy
  Faitalia Hamilton
  Micah Lea'alafa
  Jama Boss
  Mohamed Awad
  Alex Oikkonen
  Emiliano Tade
  Mario Bilen
  Silvio Rodić
  Sean Devine
  Marko Đorđević
  Albert Riera
  Víctor Espasandín

Top scorers
The following list is from the 2021 season onwards after New Zealand Football changed the football league system in New Zealand. From 2021, the Northern League has acted as a qualifier league to the National League.

Records
The following records are from the 2021 season onwards after New Zealand Football changed the football league system in New Zealand. From 2021, the Northern League has acted as a qualifier league to the National League. The records are up to date as of the end of the 2022 season.
 Most wins in a season: 20 – Auckland City (2022)
 Fewest defeats in a season: 1 – Auckland City (2022)
 Most goals scored in a season: 68 – Auckland City (2022)
 Fewest goals conceded in a season: 16 – Auckland City (2022)
 Most points in a season: 61 – Auckland City (2022)
 Fewest points in a season: 8 – Waiheke United, North Shore United (both 2022)
 Highest goal difference: 52 – Auckland City (2022)
 Biggest home win: – Birkenhead United 9–0 Melville United (1 May 2021)
 Biggest away win:
 North Shore United 1–7 Auckland City (18 April 2022)
 North Shore United 1–7 Melville United (21 May 2022)
 North Shore United 0–6 Auckland United (20 August 2022)
 Highest scoring match: 9 goals
 Birkenhead United 9–0 Melville United (1 May 2021)
 Bay Olympic 2–7 Hamilton Wanderers (24 April 2021)
 Auckland United 6–3 Northern Rovers (17 July 2021)

MVP Winners

References

External links
National League website
Auckland Football Federation
Lotto NRFL Premier League
Northern League Honours Board

1
2
Sports leagues established in 1965
1965 establishments in New Zealand